Fox River is a stream,  long, on the Kenai Peninsula in the U.S. state of Alaska. The river heads at the terminus of the Chernof Glacier in the Kenai Mountains, then flows southwest to the northeast end of Kachemak Bay.

A census-designated place of the same name lies along the river. The river's name was first reported by Dall (1895) and may have been for Theodore Fox of the North Pacific Mining and Transportation Company, which began operations on the bay in the prior year.

See also
 List of rivers of Alaska

References

Rivers of the Kenai Peninsula
Rivers of Kenai Peninsula Borough, Alaska
Rivers of Alaska